Trinca Airport  was a public use airport in Sussex County, New Jersey, United States. The airport was owned by Green Township and located three nautical miles (6 km) southwest of the central business district of Andover. Purchased by the municipality of Green Township, Trinca was closed on September 30, 2020.

Facilities and aircraft 
Trinca Airport covered an area of 12 acres (5 ha) at an elevation of 600 feet (183 m) above mean sea level. It had one runway designated 6/24 with a turf surface measuring 1,924 by 135 feet (586 x 41 m).

For the 12-month period ending January 1, 2013, the airport had 11,395 general aviation aircraft operations, an average of 31 per day. At that time there were 10 aircraft based at this airport: 70% single-engine, 20% multi-engine, and 10% ultralight.

See also 
 List of airports in New Jersey

References

External links 
 Trinca Airport (13N) archived copy from New Jersey DOT Airport Directory
 Aerial image as of 2020
 Abandoned & Little-Known Airfields: Northwestern New Jersey: Trinca Airport entry
 AirNav 13N Trinca Airport, Andover, New Jersey entry
 Aerial Photograph by A Davidson from BusinessYab Trinca entry
 FaceBook Trinca Memories page

Airports in New Jersey
Transportation buildings and structures in Sussex County, New Jersey